Sindhu Shyam is an Indian film and television actress, and a Bharathanatyam dancer. She made her acting debut through the Malayalam film Bhoothakkannadi directed by A. K. Lohithadas. Her role as Thilagavathi in Deivamagal increased her fame and gave her the other name Thilaga. She made her television debut with the serial Shakthi. She is known for her roles as  Revathy and Thilagavathy Raju in Pagal Nilavu and Deivamagal, respectively.

Career
She started learning Dance from age 4,winning several prizes in Kerala School Youth Festival. She began her acting career from 16 years old through the Malayalam film Bhoothakkannadi. She acted villainous as well as positive roles in Tamil serials.

Filmography

Television
Serials

Reality shows
Mrs.Chinnathirai (Star Vijay)
Kitchen Super Star season 2 (Star Vijay)

References

Indian television actresses
Living people
1983 births
Actresses in Malayalam television
Actresses in Malayalam cinema
Actresses in Tamil cinema
Tamil television actresses
Actresses in Tamil television